Collapse or its variants may refer to:

Concepts
 Collapse (structural)
 Collapse (topology), a mathematical concept
 Collapsing manifold 
 Collapse, the action of collapsing or telescoping objects
 Collapsing user interface elements
 Accordion (GUI) -- collapsing list items
 Code folding -- collapsing subsections of programs or text
 Outliner -- supporting folding and unfolding subsections
 Ecosystem collapse or Ecological collapse
 Economic collapse
 Gravitational collapse creating astronomical objects
 Societal collapse
 Dissolution of the Soviet Union, the collapse of Soviet federalism
 State collapse
 Wave function collapse, in physics

Medicine and biology
In medicine, collapse can refer to various forms of transient loss of consciousness such as syncope, or loss of postural muscle tone without loss of consciousness. It can also refer to:

 Circulatory collapse
 Lung collapse
 Hydrophobic collapse in protein folding

Art, entertainment and media

Literature
 Collapse: How Societies Choose to Fail or Succeed, a book by Jared Diamond
 Collapse (journal), a journal of philosophical research and development published in the United Kingdom

Film
 Collapse (film), a 2009 documentary directed by Chris Smith and starring Michael Ruppert
 Collapse, a 2010 documentary film based on the book Collapse: How Societies Choose to Fail or Succeed

Games
 Collapse (2008 video game), an action game released in 2008 for Microsoft Windows
 Collapse!, a 1999 series games created by GameHouse
 Collapse, a fictional event in the computer game Dreamfall
 The Collapse (Deus Ex), a fictional event within the plot of the computer game Deus Ex and its sequel Deus Ex: Invisible War

Music

Albums
 Collapse (Across Five Aprils album), 2006
 Collapse (Deas Vail album), 2006
 Collapse EP, 2018 record by Aphex Twin

Songs
 "Collapse" (Soul Coughing song), 1996
 "Collapse" (Saosin song), 2006
 "Collapse" (Imperative Reaction song), 2006
 "Collapsed" (Aly & AJ song), 2005

See also
 
 Cave-in, a kind of structural collapse
 Disintegrate (disambiguation)
 Fall (disambiguation)
 Telescoping (mechanics), the action of collapsing objects